Dema is an unincorporated community in Floyd and Knott counties in the U.S. state of Kentucky. Dema has a post office with ZIP code 41845.

References

Unincorporated communities in Floyd County, Kentucky
Unincorporated communities in Knott County, Kentucky
Unincorporated communities in Kentucky